Marco Iacobellis Nahara (born 27 December 1999) is an Argentine professional footballer who plays as a forward for All Boys.

Career
Iacobellis had a youth spell with Huracán up until 2015, with a two-year stint with Platense subsequently arriving before he joined the youth ranks of All Boys in 2017. Iacobellis made the breakthrough into senior football in March 2019, as Pablo Solchaga selected him off the substitutes bench during a Copa Argentina win away to Primera B Nacional's Sarmiento on 27 March.

Career statistics
.

References

External links

1999 births
Living people
Footballers from Buenos Aires
Argentine footballers
Association football forwards
Primera B Metropolitana players
All Boys footballers